Don Pedro Coloma (died 27 December 1621), Baron of Bornhem and Lord of Bobadilla, was a Spanish officer in the Army of Flanders who established a noble line in the Habsburg Netherlands, a branch of the famous House of Coloma.

Family 
Coloma was the son of Juan Coloma, a knight in the Order of Santiago, and Doña Maria Fernadez, Lady of Bobadilla. In 1585 he married Jeanne l'Escuyer, Viscountess of Dourlens, with whom he had three sons: Alexander, a captain of light cavalry, who succeeded him but died childless in 1625; Diego, who served as a gentleman in the household of Philip III of Spain; and Pierre, who continued the line.

Career 
Coloma arrived in the Low Countries in 1577, to fight against the Dutch Revolt, and in 1586 bought the lordship of Bornhem in Flanders. He built a manor house on the site of Bornem Castle. He also restored and improved the medieval duck decoy on the estate, and in 1603 founded a religious community that is now Bornem Abbey.

References 

1621 deaths
Coloma family
People from Bornem
Military personnel of the Spanish Netherlands